Maxim Kaibkhanovich Dadashev (September 30, 1990 – July 23, 2019) was a Russian boxer who competed in the light-welterweight (63.5 kg) division. A participant of the 2015 European Games, Dadashev was a Russian amateur champion. Born in Leningrad, Soviet Union (now Saint Petersburg, Russia), he was of Lezgin descent.

Amateur career
Dadashev continued his amateur career into college; he studied at Baltic State Technical University and graduated with a degree in sports management.

Professional career
Trained by former world champion Buddy McGirt in Oxnard, California, Dadashev won his first 13 professional bouts, 11 of them knockouts or technical knockouts. In his professional debut in April 2016, he won with a first-round knockout of Darin Hampton. Dadashev won the vacant WBC-NABF light-welterweight title in June 2018 with a tenth-round stoppage of Darleys Pérez, and defended it in October 2018 with a ten-round decision win over former WBC lightweight champion Antonio DeMarco.

Death
On July 19, 2019, Dadashev fought Subriel Matías as part of a Top Rank event aired by ESPN at the MGM National Harbor in Oxon Hill, Maryland. The fight was an IBF light-welterweight title elimination bout with the winner receiving a shot at the title. Dadashev lost via stoppage after his trainer, Buddy McGirt, asked the referee to stop the contest at the end of the eleventh round. Dadashev, losing significantly on the official scorecards, protested but McGirt overruled him believing that he could not take any more punishment; McGirt later said he had considered doing so two rounds earlier as he felt his fighter was fading and taking too many hits.

Dadashev needed help to get out of the ring and was unable to make it to his dressing room before he collapsed and vomited in the corridor. He was rushed to the University of Maryland Prince George's Hospital Center, where he was diagnosed with a subdural hematoma and underwent emergency surgery to stop the bleeding. He was then placed in an induced coma to try to allow the swelling in his brain to subside. However, Dadashev's condition worsened and on July 23 he died in the hospital. He is survived by his wife, Elizaveta, and a son.

Aftermath
The Boxing Federation of Russia launched an investigation into the tragedy, and pledged to support Dadashev's family financially. The Maryland State Athletic Commission will also conduct an investigation. Dadashev's body was sent to his hometown of Saint Petersburg, Russia, for funeral services and burial. Promoter Bob Arum will pay for the funeral expenses, and a GoFundMe page was setup to raise funds for Dadashev's wife and son. The farewell ceremony took place in Petergof on August 4.

Professional boxing record

See also
List of deaths due to injuries sustained in boxing
Traumatic brain injury

References

External links

1990 births
2019 deaths
Boxers at the 2015 European Games
Deaths due to injuries sustained in boxing
European Games competitors for Russia
Filmed deaths in sports
Light-welterweight boxers
Russian male boxers
Russian people of Lezgian descent
Sports deaths in Maryland
Sportspeople from Saint Petersburg